Naismith College Coach of the Year Award is an award given by the Atlanta Tipoff Club to one men's and one women's NCAA Division I collegiate coach each season since 1987. The award was originally given to the two winning coaches of the NCAA Division I basketball tournament for the first two years of its existence; in 1989, the Naismith Award's governing board decided to give it out via voting process.

The men's side has had five multiple winners:  John Calipari and Mike Krzyzewski with three each, and Tony Bennett, Mark Few, and Jay Wright with two each.

The women's side has also had five multiple winners: Geno Auriemma with eight, Pat Summitt with five, Muffet McGraw and Tara VanDerveer with three each, and Dawn Staley with two.

Key

Winners

See also
List of coaches in the Naismith Memorial Basketball Hall of Fame
Naismith College Player of the Year
James Naismith

External links
 Naismith Trophy

Awards established in 1987
College basketball coach of the year awards in the United States